Uncial 0103 (in the Gregory-Aland numbering), ε 43 (Soden), is a Greek uncial manuscript of the New Testament. It is dated paleographically to the 7th-century.

Description 

The codex contains a small part of the Gospel of Mark 13:34-14:25 on two parchment leaves (22.5 by 16.5 cm). The text is written in two columns per page, 30 lines per page, 9 and more letters in line. The uncial letters are round and square, they are small.

There is also a division according to the smaller Ammonian Sections, with references to the Eusebian Canons (written below Ammonian Section numbers). It contains lectionary markings, and music notes.

It is a palimpsest, the upper text contains a homily in Hebrew.

The Greek text of this codex is a representative of the Byzantine text-type. Aland placed it in Category V.

Currently it is dated by the INTF to the 7th-century.

The codex currently is located in the Bibliothèque nationale de France (Suppl. Gr. 726, ff. 6-7), at Paris.

See also 

 List of New Testament uncials
 Textual criticism

References

Further reading 

 J. H. Greenlee, Nine Uncial Palimpsests of the New Testament, Studies & Documents XXXIX (Salt Lake City, 1968).

Greek New Testament uncials
7th-century biblical manuscripts
Palimpsests
Bibliothèque nationale de France collections